Květa Peschke and Rennae Stubbs were the defending champions, but chose not to participate that year.

Yung-jan Chan and Chia-jung Chuang won in the final 2–6, 7–5, 10–4, against Eva Hrdinová and Vladimíra Uhlířová.

Seeds

Draw

Draw

External links
Draw

East West Bank Classic
Doubles
East West Bank Classic - Doubles